Brian Jacobs (born 30 March 1995) is a Dutch professional footballer who plays as a striker for VV Chevremont.

References

External links
 

1995 births
Living people
Association football forwards
Dutch footballers
Roda JC Kerkrade players
Eredivisie players
Sportspeople from Heerlen
Footballers from Limburg (Netherlands)
21st-century Dutch people